Steve James (born July 15, 1950, Manhattan, New York City, United States) was an American folk blues musician. A multi-instrumentalist, singer, and songwriter, James operated in the fields of acoustic and folk blues. Without the benefit of promotion from a major record label, James had secured his fan base from consistent touring.

Biography
James played a National steel guitar, mandolin, and the banjo, having become fixated, as an adolescent, on blues music. As a teenager in New York City, James listened to his father's record collection, which included recordings from Lead Belly, Josh White, and Meade "Lux" Lewis.  Following relocation to Tennessee, he met both Sam McGee and Furry Lewis. In 1977, he moved to San Antonio, Texas, and played along with various musicians including Bo Diddley, John P. Hammond and Dave Van Ronk.

James' earliest recordings were Two Track Mind (1993), American Primitive (1994), and Art & Grit (1996). Bob Brozman played some slide guitar on Art & Grit, and Danny Barnes has appeared on a number of James' recordings.

In 2000, the Portland, Oregon based, Burnside Records label, issued Boom Chang. Three years later Burnside released, Fast Texas, where James was accompanied by Cindy Cashdollar on steel and dobro guitars; plus Ruthie Foster and Cyd Cassone on vocals. James' own songs appeared on Fast Texas, as well as covers of work from Hop Wilson, Milton Brown, and Little Hat Jones. Cashdollar and Alvin Youngblood Hart had previously guested on Boom Chang.

James' playing has also appeared on recordings from James McMurtry and Ana Egge. He has released an instructional video and contributed to Acoustic Guitar.

He continued to tour around the world and incorporated teaching sessions on guitar playing techniques.

Discography
Two Track Mind (1993) - Discovery
American Primitive (1994) - Antone's
Art & Grit (1996) - Texas Music Group
Not for Highway Use: Austin Sessions 1988-1995 (2000) - Settlement
Boom Chang (2000) - Burnside Distribution
Fast Texas (2003) - Burnside Distribution
Tonight (2004) - Artist One-Stop
Steve James + Del Rey (2004) - Hobemian Records
Short Blue Stories (2009) - Hobemian Records
 Steve James Live, Vol. I, Austin TX and Berkeley CA (2016) - Hobemian Records HB0020
 Steve James, Blues and Folk Songs, Volume 1 (2018) - Hobemian Records HB0023

References

1950 births
Living people
American acoustic guitarists
American male guitarists
American blues guitarists
American blues mandolinists
American blues singers
American male singers
American multi-instrumentalists
Singers from New York City
Songwriters from New York (state)
People from Manhattan
Slide guitarists
Discovery Records artists
Guitarists from New York City
20th-century American guitarists
20th-century American male musicians
American male songwriters